The following highways are numbered 593:

United States